Nebria tenella tenella is a subspecies of black coloured ground beetle in the Nebriinae subfamily that can be found in Georgia and Russia.

Distribution
It can also be found in the Kyafar-Agur river, of the same region.

References

tenella tenella
Beetles described in 1850
Beetles of Asia